Blaster is the name of several fictional characters in the Transformers television and comic series based on the popular toy line produced by Takara Tomy and Hasbro. Due to trademark reasons, he is sometimes called Autobot Blaster. He is an Autobot who specializes in communications.

Transformers: Generation 1
Blaster's initial transformation is an AM/FM Stereo Cassette Player, commonly referred to as a boombox or ghettoblaster, hence the name. Blaster was a popular character from the original series while not featuring as prominently in the modern Transformers universe.

As a member of the Autobot communications sub-group Blaster frequently worked with its other members – Eject, Grand Slam, Raindance, Ramhorn, Rewind and Steeljaw. He is the Autobots' answer to the evil Decepticon Soundwave, who serves as his archenemy.

Blaster (Tempo in France, Radiorobot in Italy, Broadcast in Japan, Össztűz in Hungary), like the Autobot Jazz, has a great love of Earth culture, rock music and other forms of music as long as it is hard. He's normally at the forefront of any given situation. As an AM/FM stereo cassette player, he can perform as a deck, plus receive radio signals on a variety of frequencies. Acting as the Autobot communications center, he can transmit signals within a 4,000 mile radius. Blaster is often depicted as carrying various cassette tape warriors within his deck, including (Steeljaw, Ramhorn, Rewind and Eject).

Reception
According to Dan Fleming in Powerplay: toys as popular culture, Blaster represents a guardian of more primitive heroes, as well as the hidden power of technology.

Blaster was voted the 5th top Transformer who was “bad ass” in the comics by Topless Robots.

According to Heather Hendershots book about Saturday Morning cartoons, Blaster has a "black coded" voice and name.

Animated series
Blaster's first appearance was in episode 20, "Dinobot Island, Part 1" with no origin provided, simply appearing among the Autobots. Blaster frequently spoke in rhyme resembling rap music lyrics.

He had several important appearances in season 2, most notably in "Blaster Blues", when Spike and Carly brought Blaster to a concert because he loved music. Blaster decided to share his music by transmitting the show to the other Autobots but drove everyone but Cosmos and Jazz, who liked his taste in music, crazy also because the music was so loud they were unable to respond to a Decepticon attack as they got away with stealing a powerful decoder. Blaster and Cosmos went looking for the Decepticon in space then as luck would have it they found something on the moon which turned out to be a Decepticon hideout. Blaster and Cosmos listen in on their plans to conquer the Earth but they ended up getting captured by Astrotrain when they got discovered by Megatron. After they got captured, Megatron decided to use Blaster as a transcrambler with Cosmos being used as a power booster for their device which could foul up Earth commutation systems. Blaster, who wanted to stop Megatron's plan and to redeem himself from before, tipped the other Autobots the Decepticons location by transmitting his music when Megatron ransomed the humans into giving all their energy reverses. Blaster ejected some feedback to overload the Decpeticons machine with Cosmos offering a power boost to destroy it, after Megatron and Astrotrain left base to confront Omega Supreme, Powerglide, Optimus Prime, Spike and Carly when they arrived to stop them and to rescue them, which stop their plans.

In the episode "Prime Target", the big game hunter Lord Chumley captures a secret Soviet jet, leading to panic and the possibility of war. Chumley then set his sights on the ultimate trophy, the head of Optimus Prime. In order to lure Optimus in, Chumley captures the Autobots Tracks, Bumblebee, Jazz, Beachcomber, Grapple, Blaster and Inferno. Windcharger and Huffer are able to avoid being trapped. When Cosmos learns of the location Chumley was keeping the captured Autobots, Optimus Prime accepts Chumley's challenge to meet him alone. Although interrupted by the Decepticons Astrotrain and Blitzwing's attempt to ally the Decepticons with Chumley, Optimus defeats the big game hunter and frees the Autobots. Chumley and the stolen jet were handed over to the Soviets by the Autobots as punishment for his actions.

He also had a prominent role in "Auto-Bop". In the episode, Blaster and Tracks encounter Raoul, someone who Tracks has encountered before. Raoul and the posse, the Bop Crew, were finding something suspicious about a nightclub called the Dancitron. As the two Autobots investigate, they find a scheme plotted by the Decepticons Soundwave and Starscream. Later, while Tracks in his Cybertronian shuttle craft mode chases Starscream in an aerial battle, Blaster faces off with his Decepticon counterpart Soundwave in a sonic duel, resulting in a rivalry between the two.

In The Transformers: The Movie, set in the year 2005, Blaster was assigned to Autobot City on Earth. During the invasion by Megatron's forces, Blaster was responsible for sending a distress signal to Optimus Prime on Moonbase One. Upon Megatron's orders, Soundwave releases Rumble, Frenzy, Ravage, and Ratbat to jam the transmission to prevent him from establishing contact with the Autobot Moonbase. After Blaster's broadcasting message was interrupted and blocked, Soundwave's cassette minions attack the communications tower. For the first time we also see Blaster's own cassettes, Eject, Rewind, Ramhorn, and Steeljaw. The signal is received and Optimus Prime is able to arrive with reinforcements to defeat the Decepticons. After the attack, Blaster picked up transmissions from Moonbases One and Two. He was not seen for the rest of the film.

In episode 78, Madman's Paradise, Spike Witwicky and his wife Carly host a banquet for a visiting ambassador. Their son Daniel gets bored and wandered off. Grimlock follows him, and they fall into a lost chamber where Quintessons banished their criminals to other dimensions. They slipped through to the sorcerous other-dimensional realm of Menonia, and are tricked into fighting on the Red Wizard's side, only to find out that he is the Quintesson criminal, who overthrew the Golden One. Blaster, Ultra Magnus, Eject, Rewind, Ramhorn, and Steeljaw follow, and using Blaster's amplification, they help the Golden One defeat the Red Wizard. With the help of Perceptor, the Autobots and Daniel are returned to Cybertron.

He continued to appear throughout the season 3. His last appearance in the U.S. cartoon was in episode 95, "The Return of Optimus Prime, Part 2".

Blaster is destroyed in the Japanese The Transformers: Headmasters series during a fight with Soundwave (who also perished in the fight) and rebuilt two episodes later as Twincast, with a blue/white color scheme as opposed to the red/yellow previously. After a pivotal role in Operation Cassette, he featured as a regular character throughout the whole series. The Twincast toy was most recently re-issued by eHobby. Aside from the blue/yellow color scheme, the Twincast toy also differs from the Blaster/Broadcast toy in that the tape compartment can hold two cassette Transformers simultaneously.

Comics

Dreamwave Productions
Blaster was among the Autobot resistance during the Age of Interment, shown in the third War Within series.

In the second Generation 1 miniseries from Dreamwave Productions, Blaster is part of a resistance group led by Hot Rod. He accompanies Optimus Prime during his attack on Iacon.

IDW Publishing
Blaster was recently the subject of a Spotlight issue in 2008. The comic depicts Blaster as "The Voice", acting much like a radio DJ and bolstering Autobot morale in the war against the Decepticons. In the comic, Blaster's alternate form is a tank with a pair of large sonic cannons.

In “Spotlight: Blaster”, Blaster was badly damaged and left adrift in space, but was discovered by an alien ship who bought him back to the Autobot Command Hub under the command of Silverbolt. Having little memory of the event himself, Blaster finds that he was betrayed and nearly killed by a fellow Autobot just before his regular broadcast, in order to demoralize the Autobots just before a Decepticon attack. When the assassin tries again, Blaster eventually finds out that his attacker was Beachcomber, who was being controlled by the Decepticon Bombshell at the behest of Soundwave. Blaster manages to talk Beachcomber into resisting the control, which nearly burns out his mind. Blaster swears to get revenge on Soundwave.

Marvel Comics
In the Marvel Transformers comics Blaster originally appeared in issue #17, attempting to rescue his friend Scrounge, who was to be executed by Straxus. Blaster is captured himself and forced to watch his friend die. He is rescued by Perceptor and his Autobot group. Later, spying on Straxus' use of the Space Bridge, the Autobots decide to attack and blow it up. They discover the Space Bridge is their comrade Spanner. Blaster then battles Straxus one-on-one, seemingly destroying him. With the Space Bridge blowing itself up, Blaster has no choice but to lead his comrades (Beachcomber, Cosmos, Perceptor, Powerglide, Seaspray and Warpath) across the Bridge to Earth.

Their luck didn't improve as they were attacked by Megatron and his troops on arrival, only being saved when Megatron decides to attack the Autobot bases instead. Circuit Breaker, a super-powered human whose crippling in an attack by Shockwave had left her with a pathological hatred of all Transformers, then attacks and defeated them. She mounts their heads in her Rapid Anti-Robot Attack Team headquarters. After capturing the Aerialbots as well a new problem arose. The Decepticon Battlechargers Runabout and Runamuck had been causing mayhem all across America. Using the parts from all the captured Autobots she creates a giant Autobot with herself in control, striking a deal with them that if they would co-operate she would let them go. Circuit Breaker then uses them to oppose the two Decepticons, who were attacking the Statue of Liberty. After defeating the Decepticons with Circuit Breaker the Autobots were released and rebuilt into their original forms.

After a brief side adventure in the UK comics, in which Blaster's group are attacked (and almost killed) by the insane future Decepticon Galvatron, Blaster and his men join up with the main Autobots on Earth. Soon after they join, Optimus Prime dies. Blaster delivers the eulogy at his funeral.

In issue #27, "King of the Hill!", Perceptor summons his fellow Autobots Blaster, Hot Spot, Jetfire, Omega Supreme, Ratchet and Silverbolt in order to decide who should take leadership of the Autobots. After an attack by the giant Decepticon Trypticon, Grimlock is chosen to lead them.

Blaster would soon regret this. After a mission where their cover had been blown by the Mechanic, a human, he and Goldbug, appalled by Grimlock's willingness to sacrifice humans to achieve their goals, desert. They also ran because they fear Grimlock's anger.

They had more adventures; facing the Decepticon Triple Changers and a plague of Scraplets, as well as facing off with a Decepticon strike force sent to destroy Galvatron and Ultra Magnus. Blaster (himself getting more callous) is robbed of his ally when Goldbug and the Throttlebots are betrayed by humans and captured by RAAT. He is subsequently attacked by both the Combaticons and the Protectobots, who had been sent by Grimlock to arrest him. The two combiner teams battled, with Bruticus beating Defensor. With aid from some human children Blaster takes out the giant Decepticon. As a reward, he locks Blast Off into his Decepticon shuttle mode and took them into space. There, they are attacked by Grimlock and the Ark. Surrendering to save their lives, Blaster discovers he was not alone in his discontent, especially after Grimlock had tried to have the kids executed.

Events came to a head when Fortress Maximus's group of Autobots link up with Grimlock's group, informing him that many of their group's number had been empowered by linking themselves with humans via the Headmaster and Targetmaster processes. Grimlock is not pleased, and it was quickly realized he had to be defeated. A recently rebuilt and imprisoned Goldbug convinces Blaster to fight in Maximus' place. In the midst of their duel, Ratbat's Decepticons attacked, and the two put aside their differences to lead the Autobots to a partial victory. During the conflict, Maximus sent a unit of his troops back to Nebulos so that Prime will be resurrected via the Powermaster process. Prime soon returns and retakes command, sending Blaster to investigate the Decepticon island resort Club Con, seemingly run by Buster Witwicky. Accompanying Buster's girlfriend Jessie, he soon had his cover blown by the Seacons and was forced to flee.

Blaster encounters time-traveling Autobots who intended to deal with Galvatron, a plot detailed in the UK comics. This encounter results in Blaster being displaced to an alternate limbo realm.

He is soon freed, only to be deactivated by the Underbase powered Starscream.

Blaster was seen among the Autobots being repaired on the Ark when Optimus Prime sent Landmine and Cloudburst on their mission to obtain computer chips to repair fellow Autobots in issue #52, "Guess Who The Mechannibals Are Having For Dinner?". Despite rescuing Sky Lynx, the two Autobots' mission ended in failure, when the pair realized the Mechannibals came by their computer chips by recycling them from other robots they ate.

Blaster's body was seen among the deactivated Autobots Ratchet is doing his best to revive in Transformers #56, "Back from the Dead".

This was not the end for Blaster; he is one of the Autobots revived by Nucleon by Grimlock and the other Dinobots. Returning to Cybertron, he battles against the coming of Unicron. After the betrayal of the Decepticons, the Autobots follow them to the planet Klo, where they were ambushed. Blaster is one of the few survivors. Then he is badly damaged by Quake's tank mode while Prowl berates Grimlock for inept strategy. He still makes the final battle along with Grimlock, Prowl and a few others. He was present when Optimus Prime returned with the Last Autobot and routed the Decepticon forces.

The future Blaster from the Movie continuity would also appear in the UK comics, as one of the crew of Autobot city. Arcee's unintentional dereliction of duty allows a Quintesson sneak attack to catch the city unawares, and Blaster appears to get killed trying to radio for help. His body was later strung up by the Quintessons as a taunting gesture to the other Autobots. However, he helps his comrades from "beyond the grave", allowing his cassettes Steeljaw, Eject and Ramhorn to assist in taking back the city.

It later transpires that depictions of Blaster's "death" had been greatly exaggerated; he shows up, alive and well, in the prologue to the Time Wars saga, set months after the Quintesson attack on Autobot City.

TFcon comics
Blaster appeared in the TFcon 2008 voice play "Primitive Recall."

Toys
 Generation 1 Blaster (1985)
The toy that was to become the Autobot Blaster was originally released as part of the Micro Change subset of the Japanese Microman series. He was later released in 1985 by Hasbro in the U.S.
 Generation 1 Kabaya Gum Broadcast (1985)
Part of the original gum toy series by Kabaya. Each package comes with a stick of chewing gum and an easy-to-assemble kit. The completed robot looks and transforms almost the same as the larger, original Takara version, but lacks the original's eject mechanism and yellow paint applications.
 Generation 1 Twincast (1987)
A remold of Blaster available only in Japan. Blue in color and could hold 2 cassettes at once.

 Generation 1 Action Master Blaster (1990)
Came with a back pack and weapon.
 Binaltech Asterisk Broadblast with Lumina Hoshi (2005)
In 2005, Takara launched a sub-line from the Binaltech series, called Binaltech Asterisk, which paired Binaltech characters with female co-pilots. The third figure in the line is called Broadblast. He is paired with news reporter Lumina Hoshi. Broadblast is a silver repaint of Binaltech Skids, and does not have an equivalent in the Alternators line. Like Binaltech Skids, Broadblast is unusual among the Alternators/Binaltech toys, as he comes with a set of stickers which can be applied by the purchaser. The sticker set is similar to that supplied with Skids, but does not include Skids' characteristic red stripe stickers.
 Generation 1 Reissue Twincast with Flipsides
An ehobby exclusive. Shipped with the new cassette partner Flipsides.
 Universe Classic Series Voyager Autobot Blaster with Blockrock (2008)
A redeco of Cybertron Soundwave was first displayed at the 2008 New York Toy Fair.
 Smallest Transformers Blaster (2010)
An unlicensed figure produced by Justitoys recreates Blaster in the style of the Smallest Transformers line. A blue/yellow redeco was later released to represent Twincast.
 Device Label Broad Blast/Blaster (2010)
A poseable Blaster figure that transforms into a Toshiba Satellite laptop that also doubles as a working 4-port USB hub. In robot mode, his chest can fit any of the Generation 1 cassette robots.
 Universe Generation 1 Series Autobot Blaster with Steeljaw, Ramhorn and Eject (2010)
A San Diego Comic-Con International exclusive reissue of the original figure with cassettes Steeljaw, Ramhorn and Eject.

 War for Cybertron: Kingdom Blaster with Eject

A new rendition of Blaster that converts from robot to a modern/futuristic Boombox that comes with his tape: Eject. Will be rereleased as part of the Transformers: Legacy toyline.

Transformers: Universe
A new version of Blaster was introduced in the Transformers: Universe toyline.

Toys
Autobot Blasters
A recolor of Transformers: Cybertron Soundwave with a recolored Laserbeak identified as "Blockrock."

Shattered Glass

This Blaster is an evil mirror universe version of the Generation 1 character. He is evil, sadistic and speaks with a thick German accent.

Fun Publications
Blaster is one of the many Autobots aboard the Ark in Do Over by Fun Publications. The Ark launches from Cybertron for Earth under the command of Rodimus and is followed by the Decepticon ship Nemesis, under the command of Starscream. While battling over Earth it is shot down by human defense systems.

Blaster is spotlighted in the story Blitzwing Bop where he is one of two Autobots who were not affected by a radio disruption broadcast by the Decepticon Blitzwing. Sent to recover Blitzwing, he plans to send the Decepticon to Cybertron on the Stellar Spanner with an amplifier which will destroy everyone on the planet, including Blitzwing! He is stopped by Soundwave and Thunderwing and thrown into the Spanner, which ends up placing him on Earth's moon.

Toys
ehobby Shattered Glass Soundwave vs. Blaster (2013)
An ehobby exclusive includes recolors of the Generation 1 toys Soundblaster, Ratbat, Slugfest, Twincast, Rewind and Ramhorn in Shattered Glass colors.

Aligned Continuity

Books
Blaster appears in the novel Transformers: Retribution as part of the crew of the Ark.

Toys
 Generations Fall of Cybertron Blaster with Steeljaw (Sunder, Eject, Rewind, and Ramhorn sold separately) (2013)

Robots in Disguise
In the episode Enemy of My Enemy, Blaster was shown among the many Autobots backlisted by the new High Council for being a supporter of Optimus Prime following Cybertron's restoration after the great war.

In other media

Blaster makes a cameo appearance in the 2022 film Chip 'n Dale: Rescue Rangers.

External links
 Blaster at TFWIKI.Net, the Transformers Wiki
 Champions RPG character sheet for Blaster.
 Gallery of Generation One Blaster
 Gallery of Binaltech Asterisk Broadblast

References

Transformers characters
Comics characters introduced in 1985
Fictional aircraft
Fictional characters who can manipulate sound
Male characters in animated series